Harry or Harold Ewing may refer to:

 Harry Ewing, Baron Ewing of Kirkford (1931–2007), Labour politician from Scotland
 Harry W. Ewing (1886–1962), American football player and coach
 Harold Ewing, see Korean Air Lines Flight 007 alternative theories

See also
 Henry Ewing (disambiguation)